The Queen's Head is a public house at The Square, Tolleshunt D'Arcy, Essex CM9 8TF.

It is on the Campaign for Real Ale's National Inventory of Historic Pub Interiors.

There is a listed phone box in the forecourt.

References

National Inventory Pubs
Pubs in Essex